RNAS Charlton Horethorne (HMS Heron II) is a former Royal Naval Air Station in the hamlet of Sigwells in Somerset, England. It opened in 1942, as a flying training base under the administrative care of HMS Heron. It closed in 1948 and has since been returned to agricultural use.

History

The site was originally planned as a satellite station for RAF Exeter for No. 10 Group of RAF Fighter Command. Construction started in the summer of 1941. The landing strip was grass rather than tarmac and few permanent buildings apart from the control tower and two blister hangars, with aircraft being protected by blast pens. Ground defence was provided by the Somerset Light Infantry.

It opened as an RAF station on 10 July 1942 and was made available for use by the Royal Navy and 886 and 887 Squadrons, who flew Fairey Fulmars were the first to occupy the site, soon to be replaced by 790 Naval Air Squadron. Various squadrons subsequently used the station either while undergoing training and preparation for service or for fighter interception training for Air Direction Radar operators or flight controllers who were trained at RNAS Yeovilton (HMS Heron).

In August 1942 891 Naval Air Squadron transferred from RNAS Lee-on-Solent where it had been formed to Charlton Horethorne with six Sea Hurricanes to prepare for carrier operations, later transferring to RNAS St Merryn and then embarking on HMS Dasher to take part in Operation Torch. Other squadrons posted to the base during 1942 included: 782, 879 and 809 Naval Air Squadrons.

On 1 December 1942 Charlton Horethorne was formally transferred from the RAF to the Admiralty and designated as HMS Heron II, which had previously been at RNAS Haldon. In 1943 a new watch tower was built, more runways laid out in the grass and further hangars built. Further squadrons were temporarily stationed at the base with 780 Squadron staying the longest. In 1945 the base was taken over by RAF Maintenance Command who used it for storage until the end of 1947. It then became a satelitte training field for RAF Old Sarum and kept on a Care and Maintenance basis until it was de-requisitioned and returned to farmland.

A number of units were here at some point:

Post closure
The control tower was converted by Norman Clothier a local builder in Charlton Horethorne in the sixties.

The old control tower still stands and has been converted into a domestic dwelling.

See also
 List of air stations of the Royal Navy
 Charlton Horethorne

References

Charlton Horethorne